"The Deer & the Wolf" is a song by English recording artist Sophie Ellis-Bextor from her fifth studio album Wanderlust (2014). The song was released as the fourth and final single of the album on 25 August 2014. It was co-written by Ed Harcourt and Ellis-Bextor; whilst production was handled by the former. It was remixed under the name of "The Deer & The Wolf (Role Reversal)" for the Wandermix edition of the album.

The music video for the song was directed by Harry Cauty of Kode Media, and features Ellis-Bextor performing the song in a forest set with her band. A month later, Sophie uploaded an acoustic version of the song to her official YouTube account, played with the whole band lying on a bed.

Track listing
Promotional CD single
Details adapted from the liner notes of "The Deer & the Wolf"'s CD single.

 "The Deer & the Wolf" (Radio edit) –

Release history

References

2014 singles
2014 songs
Sophie Ellis-Bextor songs
Songs written by Ed Harcourt
Songs written by Sophie Ellis-Bextor